Prep and Pep is a 1928 American comedy film directed by David Butler and written by John Stone and Malcolm Stuart Boylan. The film stars David Rollins, Nancy Drexel, John Darrow, E. H. Calvert, Frank Albertson, and Robert Peck. The film was released on November 18, 1928, by Fox Film Corporation.

Cast      
David Rollins as Cyril Reade
Nancy Drexel as Dorothy Marsh
John Darrow as Flash Wells
E. H. Calvert as Col. Marsh
Frank Albertson as Bunk Hill
Robert Peck as Coach

References

External links
 

1928 films
1920s English-language films
Silent American comedy films
1928 comedy films
Fox Film films
Films directed by David Butler
American silent feature films
American black-and-white films
1920s American films